The TRG-300 Tiger (also known as TRG-300 Kasirga)  is a Turkish guided multiple launch rocket system manufactured by the ROKETSAN corporation. The system has four 300 mm rocket launcher tubes and its rockets can hit a maximum range of 120 km.

Synopsis

Typical Tiger battery systems are composed of a Command and Control Vehicle with between six and nine launcher vehicles (F-302T) and an equal number of resupply and reloading vehicles. TRG-300 Missile can be launched from ROKETSAN Multi-Barrel Rocket Launcher and other platforms with compatible interfaces. Each rocket has four fixed fins and reaches a maximum flight altitude of 30,000m with a maximum speed of Mach 4.2. The rockets use a composite solid propellant system (HTPB) and are usually fitted with a Blast Fragmentation warhead consisting of 26,000 steel balls. The system has aerodynamic control with electromechanical actuation system.

The TRG-300 Tiger MBRL  is based on Chinese WS-1  (Wei Shi; Guardian), with some modifications on the design with launcher very similar to the WS-1B 's launcher. In Turkish land forces service, the 300 mm TRG-300 Tiger MBRL system provides long range fire support.

The TRG-300 Tiger MBRLS consists of two key parts: The launcher system (T-300) and the rocket, TRG-300. The T-300 MBRL is based on the German MAN Diesel (6×6) 26.372 10t cross-country truck chassis. Combat weight, complete with four rockets, is 23t. The launcher vehicle's cabin windows are provided with shutters which are lowered before the rockets are launched.

This MAN (6×6) also serves as T-122 launch platform for Turkish land forces command F-302T.

History
In 1997, an agreement was signed with CPMIEC (Chinese Precision Machinery Import and Export Company) for the joint development and manufacture of an offshoot of the WS-1 system. The Kasirga system was first commissioned in the year 2000.

In 2016, the TRG-300 Tiger system was sold to Azerbaijan.

In March 2019, ROKETSAN secured a contract to supply a regiment of medium-range guided multiple rocket launchers to Bangladesh. According to the statement given by the Bangladesh Chief of General Staff Gen.18 units have been  delivered to the Bangladesh Army in June 2021.

Variants

Block I
Block I has greater range with smaller warhead than Block II: 
Range: 30 – 120 km 
Weight: 585 kg 
Warhead weight: 105 kg 
Warhead effective radius: ≥ 70 m

Block II
Block II has enhanced warhead dynamic effectiveness: 
Range: 20 – 90 km
Weight: 670 kg
Warhead weight: 190 kg
Warhead effective radius: ≥ 80 m

Operators 

: 20 units
: 18 units have been delivered.

:3 units.

References

Roketsan products
Surface-to-surface missiles
Surface-to-surface missiles of Turkey
Self-propelled rocket launchers
Self-propelled artillery of the People's Republic of China
Multiple rocket launchers
Self-propelled artillery of Turkey